Helcystogramma nesidias is a moth in the family Gelechiidae. It was described by Edward Meyrick in 1911. It is found on the Seychelles, where it has been recorded from Mahé, Praslin and Silhouette.

The wingspan is 10–11 mm. The forewings are pale whitish ochreous, longitudinally streaked with ferruginous-brownish suffusion between the veins. The plical and first discal stigmata are indicated by a few longitudinally scattered dark fuscous scales, the second discal forming a distinct dark fuscous dot. There are some dark fuscous scales on the termen towards the apex. The hindwings are pale grey.

References

Moths described in 1911
nesidias
Moths of Africa